Forsskaolea tenacissima is a member of the non-stinging nettles genus Forsskaolea  and is in the same family as the stinging kind, Urticaceae.  Described as "looking like a tough character that does not want or need a caress", F. tenacissima makes its home where not many plant species survive, in stony soils, road edges, in the gravel wadi
and "in the rock crevices and water-receiving depressions" above the stone pavements of the Hamadas.

Forsskaolea tenacissima was named in mourning of a student of Carl Linnaeus, a Swede named Peter Forsskål, who died while gathering botanical and zoological specimens from the Arabia Felix. Linnaeus named this plant Forsskaolea tenacissima because the plant was as stubborn and persistent as the student had been.

Description
The almost upright  fleshy, stiff-haired, woody annual  F. tenacissima appears after the rains in rocky and difficult to grow in places like the Sahel of Mauritania, and Northeast Africa (the Horn of Africa), and now recorded in Niger.  It is a chamaephyte that is much relished by livestock.

Leaves and stems  to  leaf stalks. Upper leaf surfaces have straight and hooked hairs and the lower leaf is densely white-wooly with hair.
Four to eight male flowers and two to six female flowers in the center of the flower head which is attached right to the stem. The stigma is as long as the ovary.
	
Communities In Spain, F. tenacissima has been observed in a phytosociological situation (made "on the rocks" or in the gravel wadis of Tabernas Desert) with Senecio flavus.

F. tenacissima has been observed living low in wadis with these plant species:
Acacia tortilis
Aerva javanica
Lotononis platycarpa
Farsetia longisiliqua

It has also been found growing in rock crevices and water-receiving depressions above the stone pavements of the Hamadas along with:
Anastatica hierochuntica
Fagonia latifolia
Farsetia aegyptia
Nauplius graveolens
Reseda villosa
Salvia aegyptiaca
Enneapogon desvauxii 
Enneapogon scaber

Distribution
Common in arid and semi-arid waste lands in sandy clay gravelly soils from sea level to  like Mediterranean woodlands and shrublands, semi-steppe shrublands, shrub-steppes, deserts and extreme deserts.
Native
Palearctic: 
Northern Africa: Algeria, Egypt 
Southwestern Europe: Spain
Southeastern Europe: Malta
Western Asia: Israel, Jordan, Libya, Palestine, Sinai, Tunisia
Current
Palearctic: 
Northern Africa: Algeria, Egypt 
Southwestern Europe: Spain
Southeastern Europe: Malta
Western Asia: Afghanistan, Iran, Israel, Jordan, Libya, Pakistan, Palestine, Sinai, Tunisia
Asia Temperate: India
Afrotropic: 
Arabian Peninsula: Saudi Arabia, Oman, United Arab Emirates
Northeast Tropical Africa: Eritrea
West Tropical Africa: Mauritania

Uses
The inner bark is used by natives in Sahara for manufacturing rope.

Synonyms
Forsskaolea tenacissima L. var. cossoniana (Webb) Batt.  
Forsskaolea tenacissima L. var. erythraea A.Terracc. 
Forsskaolea tenacissima L. var. cossoniana (Webb) Batt.

References

External links

 
 

tenacissima